Theodore Sizer may refer to:

 Ted Sizer (1932–2009),  leader of educational reform in the United States
 Theodore Sizer (art historian) (1892–1967), American professor of the history of art